These are the official results of the 2016 Ibero-American Championships in Athletics which took place on 14–16 May 2016 in Rio de Janeiro, Brazil.

Men's results

100 meters
Heats – 14 MayWind:Heat 1: +0.3 m/s, Heat 2: +0.7 m/s, Heat 3: -0.8 m/s, Heat 4: -1.1 m/s

Semifinals – 14 MayWind:Heat 1: +0.4 m/s, Heat 2: +0.8 m/s

Final – 14 MayWind: +0.4 m/s

200 meters
Heats – 15 MayWind:Heat 1: +0.8 m/s, Heat 2: +0.2 m/s, Heat 3: 0.0 m/s, Heat 4: +1.1 m/s

Semifinals – 15 MayWind:Heat 1: +1.6 m/s, Heat 2: -0.2 m/s

Final – 16 MayWind: +0.3 m/s

400 meters
Heats – 14 May

Final – 15 May

800 meters
Heats – 14 May

Final – 15 May

1500 meters
16 May

3000 meters
14 May

5000 meters
16 May

110 meters hurdles
Heats – 15 MayWind:Heat 1: -1.2 m/s, Heat 2: +0.1 m/s

Final – 16 MayWind:+0.7 m/s

400 meters hurdles
Heats – 14 May

Final – 15 May

3000 meters steeplechase
14 May

4 x 100 meters relay
16 May

4 x 400 meters relay
16 May

20,000 meters walk
14 May

High jump
16 May

Pole vault
16 May

Long jump
15 May

Triple jump
16 May

Shot put
14 May

Discus throw
15 May

Hammer throw
14 May

Javelin throw
16 May

Decathlon
14–15 May

Women's results

100 meters
Heats – 14 MayWind:Heat 1: -0.7 m/s, Heat 2: -1.1 m/s, Heat 3: +0.2 m/s

Final – 14 MayWind:+0.6 m/s

200 meters
Heats – 15 MayWind:Heat 1: -0.3 m/s, Heat 2: -0.3 m/s

Final – 16 MayWind:+0.2 m/s

400 meters
Heats – 14 May

Final – 15 May

800 meters
15 May

1500 meters
16 May

3000 meters
14 May

5000 meters
16 May

100 meters hurdles
16 MayWind: -0.2 m/s

400 meters hurdles
15 May

3000 meters steeplechase
14 May

4 x 100 meters relay
16 May

4 x 400 meters relay
16 May

10,000 meters walk
15 May

High jump
14 May

Pole vault
14 May

Long jump
14 May

Triple jump
15 May

Shot put
15 May

Discus throw
15 May

Hammer throw
14 May

Javelin throw
16 May

Heptathlon
15–16 May

References

Ibero-American Championships Results
Events at the Ibero-American Championships in Athletics